Virginia Ballesteros Romano (born 25 September 1988) is a Bolivian footballer who plays as a midfielder. She has been a member of the Bolivia women's national team.

Early life
Ballesteros hails from the Potosí Department.

International career
Ballesteros played for Bolivia at senior level in the 2014 Copa América Femenina.

References

1988 births
Living people
Women's association football midfielders
Bolivian women's footballers
People from Potosí Department
Bolivia women's international footballers